Tony Bracke (born 15 December 1971 in Ghent) is a Belgian former road cyclist.

Major results

1995
 1st Flèche Ardennaise
1996
 1st Grote Prijs Beeckman-De Caluwé
1998
 1st Boucles de Seine Saint-Denis
 1st Memorial Thijssen
1999
 1st Stadsprijs Geraardsbergen
2000
 1st Grote 1-MeiPrijs
 Tour de Wallonie
1st Stages 2 & 4
2001
 4th Brussels–Ingooigem
2003
 5th Paris–Bruxelles
2006
 1st Stage 1 Tour de la Province de Namur
2007
 1st  Road race, National Amateur Road Championships

References

External links

1971 births
Living people
Belgian male cyclists
Sportspeople from Ghent
Cyclists from East Flanders